Glen Patrick Cook (born September 8, 1959) is an American former baseball player who played in Major League Baseball as a pitcher for one season. He pitched in nine games, starting seven of them for the Texas Rangers during the 1985 Texas Rangers season.

Growing up in Tonawanda, New York, Cook said his father "pushed baseball on" him and his brothers to the point that he did not allow the family to take vacations. Cook told the Fort Worth Star-Telegram, however, that he was glad that his dad pushed him so hard. Cook attended Tonawanda High School and Ithaca College where he had a 7–0 record for the Ithaca Bombers baseball team which won the 1980 NCAA Division III baseball tournament.

He was promoted to the majors on June 20, 1985, to fill a vacancy in the starting rotation left after the Rangers traded away Frank Tanana. At the time, his wife, Linda Ann, formerly of Lawton, Oklahoma, was expecting a baby.

References

External links

1959 births
Living people
Baseball players from New York (state)
Ithaca Bombers baseball players
Major League Baseball pitchers
Texas Rangers players
Acereros de Monclova players
American expatriate baseball players in Mexico
Burlington Rangers players
Gulf Coast Rangers players
Oklahoma City 89ers players
Tulsa Drillers players
Sportspeople from Erie County, New York
People from Tonawanda, New York